Aura Kingdom, also known as Fantasy Frontier Online in Taiwan and Hong Kong and Innocent World in Japan, is a massively multiplayer online role-playing game made by the Taiwanese game developer X-Legend. In Japan, it was originally called . Other notable games developed by X-Legend are Grand Fantasia and Eden Eternal.

Aura Kingdom was published by Aeria Games in January 2014. It is a free-to-play game that was announced on August 12, 2013 at Otakon 2013. Attendees at Otakon were given beta keys for the MMO.

Gameplay
The game begins by villagers asking the player to help with tasks around the village.

Players take on the role of Envoys of Gaia, who they are tasked with the mission to save Azuria, the fantasy world of  Aura Kingdom, from Darkness. Players can choose sixteen classes to play from: 
Guardian, Ravager, Duelist, Gunslinger, Grenadier, Bard, Wizard, Sorcerer, Brawler, Ranger, Ronin, Reaper, Crusader, Ninja, Lancer, and Performer. Players can then choose one of the four starting pet Eidolons, with the opportunity of recruiting more as the game progresses.

Players can have spirits as companions that grow and evolve. These spirits are known as ‘Eidolons’ that retain memories of players' accomplishments, such as boss kills, and can be conversed with.

Critical reception
Games in Asia rated the game 6.1/10, noting a strong storyline, well-done anime-style character designs and impressive graphics, but noted a lack of dungeons, repetitiveness, and unchallenging gameplay as weak points of the game.

Sources

External links
 Official Aura Kingdom website

Active massively multiplayer online games
Gamebryo games
Massively multiplayer online role-playing games
Video games developed in Taiwan
Windows games
Windows-only games
Persistent worlds
Fantasy video games
Fantasy massively multiplayer online role-playing games
2013 video games
Aeria Games games